Dr. Charlotte M. Taylor is a botanist and professor specialising in taxonomy and conservation. She works with the large plant family Rubiaceae, particularly found in the American tropics and in the tribes Palicoureeae and Psychotrieae. This plant family is an economically important group, as it includes plant species used to make coffee and quinine. Taylor also conducts work related to the floristics of Rubiaceae and morphological radiations of the group. Taylor has collected plant samples from many countries across the globe, including Chile, Colombia, Costa Rica, Panama, and the United States of America, and has named many new species known to science from these regions. As of 2015, Taylor has authored 278 land plant species' names, the seventh-highest number of such names authored by any female scientist.

Education
Taylor holds a B.S. from the University of Michigan (1978), and an M.S. (1982) and Ph.D. (1987) from Duke University.

Career
In addition to the work mentioned below, Taylor has identified many herbarium specimens at the Missouri Botanical Garden and at other institutions throughout the world.

Floras
Taylor has spent much of her career authoring floras (full treatments and catalogues), and she has contributed to several large regional floras, including:
 Flora Mesoamericana (12 genera and ca. 850 species)
 Flora of the Venezuelan Guayana (86 genera and 524 species)
 Flora of China (97 genera and ca. 700 species)
 Catalogue Rubiaceae treatments (see citations below)
 Ecuador (ca. 110 genera and 530 species)
 Peru (ca. 110 genera and 600 species)
 Bolivia (ca. 100 genera, 430 species)

Overview of taxonomic work
Taylor is an active and prolific scholar. She is one of the top 10 women to have described or named land plant species. Within the Rubiaceae group, her main focuses are the species in the neotropical genera Palicourea, Notopleura, Carapichea, Faramea, and Coussarea, the species of the pantropical genus Psychotria, and the species of the Madagascar genus Gaertnera. In addition to the numerous plants that she has named, Taylor has also conducted taxonomic work and transferred species names between different genera. For this reason, she is linked as an author to 1,091 plant species name citation records through the International Plant Names Index (IPNI). A full list of all 1,091 records can be viewed here.

Rubiaceae projects
In addition to her taxonomic work with this family, Taylor maintains two websites related Rubiaceae to the Missouri Botanical Garden website. The Selected Rubiaceae Tribes and Genera website includes taxonomic parts of previously published works related to the family. The content of the website is also incorporated in Tropicos, the online database of taxonomic information about plants maintained and populated by the Missouri Botanical Garden and its scientific staff.

Personal life
Taylor attributes her interest in plants to her parents, who were "serious bird watchers." However, she opted to study plants instead of birds because it afforded her more freedom to keep to her own research schedule.

Taylor is married to Roy E. Gereau, an Assistant Curator at the Missouri Botanical Garden. Gereau's research interests include plant nomenclature, floristics and phytogeography of eastern Africa, plant conservation assessment in eastern Africa and in Africa generally, classification and identification of East African flowering plant genera, and taxonomy and systematics of African Sapindaceae. Taylor and Gereau have published together on botanical topics.

New species described
As of 2015, Taylor has named 278 plant taxa new to science and authored a total of 771 names. She has also assigned new names to existing taxa and creating new name combinations. The first species that Taylor described is Palicourea spathacea. A combination is a previously published name that is transferred to another name, for example a species transferred to a different genus, or a variety raised to a species, a subgenus changed to a section, etc. and it keeps the same name. A full list of Taylor's authored names can be viewed through the Tropicos database.

Alibertia premontana C.M. Taylor
Alseis costaricensis C.M. Taylor
Amphidasya amethystina J.L. Clark & C.M. Taylor 
Amphidasya brevidentata C.M. Taylor
Amphidasya elegans C.M. Taylor
Amphidasya panamensis C.M. Taylor
Appunia megalantha C.M. Taylor & Lorence  
Bouvardia costaricensis C.M. Taylor
Carapichea verrucosa C.M. Taylor
Chiococca caputensis Lorence & C.M. Taylor
Chomelia chiquitensis C.M. Taylor
Chomelia costaricensis C.M. Taylor
Chomelia rubra Lorence & C.M. Taylor
Chomelia torrana C.M. Taylor
Chomelia venulosa W.C. Burger & C.M. Taylor 
Coussarea acrensis C.M. Taylor
Coussarea amplifolia C.M. Taylor
Coussarea antioquiana C.M. Taylor
Coussarea boliviensis C.M. Taylor
Coussarea brevipedunculata C.M. Taylor
Coussarea camposiana C.M. Taylor
Coussarea cephaeloides C.M. Taylor
Coussarea cephaëloides C.M. Taylor
Coussarea dulcifolia D.A. Neill, Cerón & C.M. Taylor 
Coussarea duplex C.M. Taylor
Coussarea ecuadorensis C.M. Taylor
Coussarea grandifructa C.M. Taylor
Coussarea izabalensis C.M. Taylor
Coussarea linearis C.M. Taylor
Coussarea loftonii subsp. calimana C.M. Taylor
Coussarea loftonii subsp. occidentalis C.M. Taylor
Coussarea maranonensis C.M. Taylor
Coussarea mexiae C.M. Taylor
Coussarea nigrescens C.M. Taylor & Hammel  
Coussarea pilosula C.M. Taylor
Coussarea pilosula C.M. Taylor
Coussarea pseudopilosula C.M. Taylor
Coussarea psychotrioides C.M. Taylor & Hammel  
Coussarea resinosa C.M. Taylor
Coussarea sancti-ciprianii C.M. Taylor
Coussarea spiciformis C.M. Taylor
Coussarea spiciformis C.M. Taylor
Coussarea vasqueziana C.M. Taylor
Coutarea coutaportloides C.M. Taylor
Coutarea fuchsioides C.M. Taylor
Danais antilahimenae C.M. Taylor
Danais disticha C.M. Taylor
Danais laciniata C.M. Taylor
Danais masoalana C.M. Taylor
Danais rakotovaoi C.M. Taylor
Danais randrianaivoi C.M. Taylor
Duroia laevis Devia, C.H. Perss. & C.M. Taylor 
Duroia sancti-ciprianii Devia, C.H. Perss. & C.M. Taylor 
Elaeagia chiriquina C.M. Taylor
Elaeagia glossostipula C.M. Taylor
Faramea accumulans C.M. Taylor
Faramea ampla C.M. Taylor
Faramea angusta C.M. Taylor
Faramea areolata C.M. Taylor
Faramea calimana C.M. Taylor
Faramea calyptrata C.M. Taylor
Faramea coffeoides C.M. Taylor
Faramea colombiana C.M. Taylor
Faramea condorica C.M. Taylor
Faramea correae C.M. Taylor
Faramea cupheoides C.M. Taylor
Faramea frondosa C.M. Taylor
Faramea guaramacalensis C.M. Taylor
Faramea longistipula C.M. Taylor
Faramea melicoccoides C.M. Taylor
Faramea monsalveae C.M. Taylor
Faramea ortiziana C.M. Taylor
Faramea permagnifolia Dwyer ex C.M. Taylor
Faramea robusta C.M. Taylor
Faramea sanblasensis C.M. Taylor
Faramea schunkeana C.M. Taylor
Faramea uncinata C.M. Taylor
Faramea vasquezii C.M. Taylor
Faramea verticillata C.M. Taylor
Gaertnera arenarioides C.M. Taylor
Gaertnera breviflora C.M. Taylor
Gaertnera hirsuta C.M. Taylor
Gaertnera laevis C.M. Taylor
Gaertnera littoralis C.M. Taylor
Gaertnera malcomberiana C.M. Taylor
Gaertnera masoalana C.M. Taylor
Gaertnera nitida C.M. Taylor
Gaertnera rakotovaoana C.M. Taylor
Gaertnera razakamalalana C.M. Taylor
Gaertnera robusta C.M. Taylor
Gaertnera rubra C.M. Taylor
Gaertnera sclerophylla C.M. Taylor
Gaertnera velutina C.M. Taylor
Gaertnera vernicosa C.M. Taylor
Gaertnera xerophila C.M. Taylor
Gonzalagunia mildrediae D.R. Simpson ex C.M. Taylor  
Gonzalagunia osaensis C.M. Taylor
Gonzalagunia villosa D.R. Simpson ex C.M. Taylor  
Guettarda subcapitata C.M. Taylor
Hillia grayumii C.M. Taylor
Hillia oaxacana C.M. Taylor
Hillia pumila C.M. Taylor
Hillia rivalis C.M. Taylor
Hillia subg. Andinae C.M. Taylor    
Hillia subg. Illustres C.M. Taylor    
Hillia subg. Tetrandrae C.M. Taylor    
Hippotis stellata C.M. Taylor & Rova  
Hoffmannia barbillana C.M. Taylor
Hoffmannia boliviana C.M. Taylor
Hoffmannia boraginoides Dwyer ex W.C. Burger & C.M. Taylor
Hoffmannia coriacea C.M. Taylor
Hoffmannia costaricensis C.M. Taylor
Hoffmannia formicaria C.M. Taylor
Hoffmannia hammelii C.M. Taylor
Hoffmannia limonensis C.M. Taylor
Hoffmannia micrantha C.M. Taylor
Hoffmannia pacifica C.M. Taylor
Hoffmannia pseudovesiculifera C.M. Taylor
Hoffmannia rivalis C.M. Taylor
Hoffmannia subcapitata C.M. Taylor
Hoffmannia tilaranensis C.M. Taylor
Hoffmannia turrialbana C.M. Taylor
Hoffmannia veraguensis C.M. Taylor
Ixora knappiae C.M. Taylor
Joosia antioquiana C.M. Taylor
Joosia capitata C.M. Taylor
Joosia confusa C.M. Taylor
Joosia frondosa C.M. Taylor
Ladenbergia franciscana C.M. Taylor
Malanea campylocarpa C.M. Taylor
Malanea cylindrica C.M. Taylor
Malanea ecuadorensis C.M. Taylor
Manettia longipedicellata C.M. Taylor
Margaritopsis inconspicua C.M. Taylor
Monnina ferreyrae C.M. Taylor
Monnina parasylvatica C.M. Taylor
Neoblakea ecuadorensis C.M. Taylor
Notopleura acuta C.M. Taylor
Notopleura aequatoriana C.M. Taylor
Notopleura albens C.M. Taylor
Notopleura amicitiae C.M. Taylor
Notopleura bahiensis C.M. Taylor
Notopleura biloba C.M. Taylor
Notopleura bryophila C.M. Taylor
Notopleura callejasii C.M. Taylor
Notopleura capitata C.M. Taylor
Notopleura cincinalis C.M. Taylor
Notopleura cocleensis C.M. Taylor
Notopleura congesta C.M. Taylor
Notopleura corniculata C.M. Taylor
Notopleura corymbosa C.M. Taylor
Notopleura costaricensis C.M. Taylor
Notopleura cundinamarcana C.M. Taylor
Notopleura elegans C.M. Taylor
Notopleura episcandens C.M. Taylor & Lorence  
Notopleura hondurensis C.M. Taylor
Notopleura hurtadoi C.M. Taylor
Notopleura hypolaevis C.M. Taylor
Notopleura iridescens C.M. Taylor
Notopleura lanosa C.M. Taylor
Notopleura longiflora C.M. Taylor
Notopleura longipedunculata C.M. Taylor
Notopleura montana C.M. Taylor
Notopleura multinervia C.M. Taylor
Notopleura nepokroeffiae C.M. Taylor
Notopleura obtusa C.M. Taylor
Notopleura pacorana C.M. Taylor
Notopleura parasiggersiana C.M. Taylor
Notopleura parvifolia C.M. Taylor
Notopleura penduliflora C.M. Taylor
Notopleura pilosula C.M. Taylor
Notopleura pyramidata C.M. Taylor
Notopleura recondita Hammel & C.M. Taylor
Notopleura sanblasensis C.M. Taylor
Notopleura scarlatina C.M. Taylor
Notopleura spiciformis C.M. Taylor
Notopleura steyermarkiana C.M. Taylor
Notopleura submarginalis C.M. Taylor
Notopleura torrana C.M. Taylor
Notopleura triaxillaris C.M. Taylor
Notopleura tubulistipula C.M. Taylor
Notopleura vargasiana C.M. Taylor
Notopleura zarucchiana C.M. Taylor
Paederia taolagnarensis Razafim. & C.M. Taylor
Palicourea albaniana C.M. Taylor
Palicourea albocaerulea C.M. Taylor
Palicourea anderssoniana C.M. Taylor
Palicourea andina C.M. Taylor
Palicourea andina subsp. panamensis C.M. Taylor
Palicourea anianguana C.M. Taylor
Palicourea asplundii C.M. Taylor
Palicourea australis C.M. Taylor
Palicourea awa C.M. Taylor
Palicourea azulina C.M. Taylor
Palicourea azurea C.M. Taylor
Palicourea bellula C.M. Taylor
Palicourea betancuriana C.M. Taylor
Palicourea bullulata C.M. Taylor
Palicourea cajamarcana C.M. Taylor
Palicourea calophlebioides C.M. Taylor
Palicourea canarina C.M. Taylor
Palicourea candida C.M. Taylor
Palicourea chignul C.M. Taylor
Palicourea clerodendroides C.M. Taylor
Palicourea cogolloi C.M. Taylor
Palicourea condorica C.M. Taylor
Palicourea corniculata C.M. Taylor
Palicourea cornigera C.M. Taylor
Palicourea crystallina C.M. Taylor
Palicourea cuspidata subsp. occidentalis C.M. Taylor
Palicourea cutucuana C.M. Taylor
Palicourea deviae C.M. Taylor
Palicourea diminuta C.M. Taylor
Palicourea dodsoniana C.M. Taylor
Palicourea eburnea C.M. Taylor
Palicourea foreroi C.M. Taylor
Palicourea frontinoensis Cogollo & C.M. Taylor
Palicourea garcioides C.M. Taylor
Palicourea gelsemiiflora C.M. Taylor
Palicourea gemmiflora C.M. Taylor
Palicourea gentryi C.M. Taylor
Palicourea glandulifera C.M. Taylor
Palicourea gomezii C.M. Taylor
Palicourea grandiceps C.M. Taylor
Palicourea hammelii C.M. Taylor
Palicourea harlingii C.M. Taylor
Palicourea hollinensis C.M. Taylor
Palicourea hondurensis C.M. Taylor
Palicourea ianthina C.M. Taylor
Palicourea jaramilloi C.M. Taylor
Palicourea jatun-sachensis C.M. Taylor
Palicourea kahirica C.M. Taylor
Palicourea lemoniana C.M. Taylor
Palicourea lewisiorum C.M. Taylor
Palicourea locellata C.M. Taylor
Palicourea loxensis C.M. Taylor
Palicourea lozanoana C.M. Taylor
Palicourea lugoana C.M. Taylor
Palicourea luteonivea C.M. Taylor
Palicourea macarthurorum C.M. Taylor
Palicourea madidiensis C.M. Taylor
Palicourea matamana C.M. Taylor
Palicourea meieri C.M. Taylor
Palicourea mistratoana C.M. Taylor
Palicourea murciae C.M. Taylor
Palicourea neillii C.M. Taylor
Palicourea orosiana C.M. Taylor
Palicourea orquidea C.M. Taylor
Palicourea otongaensis C.M. Taylor
Palicourea oxapampana C.M. Taylor
Palicourea pachystipula C.M. Taylor
Palicourea palaciosii C.M. Taylor
Palicourea palustris A.C. Gilman & C.M. Taylor 
Palicourea parrana C.M. Taylor
Palicourea paujilensis C.M. Taylor
Palicourea pendula C.M. Taylor
Palicourea pereziana C.M. Taylor
Palicourea plowmanii D.R. Simpson ex C.M. Taylor  
Palicourea premontana C.M. Taylor
Palicourea prodiga Standl. ex C.M. Taylor
Palicourea providenciana J. Sánchez-Gonz. & C.M. Taylor 
Palicourea purpurea C.M. Taylor
Palicourea quadrifolia subsp. leticiana C.M. Taylor
Palicourea quadrilateralis C.M. Taylor
Palicourea quinquepyrena C.M. Taylor
Palicourea rodriguezii C.M. Taylor
Palicourea roseofaucis C.M. Taylor
Palicourea sancti-ciprianii C.M. Taylor
Palicourea sanluisensis C.M. Taylor
Palicourea sect. Cephaeloides C.M. Taylor    
Palicourea sect. Chocoanae C.M. Taylor    
Palicourea sect. Crocothyrsae C.M. Taylor    
Palicourea sect. Didymocarpae C.M. Taylor    
Palicourea sect. Grandiflorae C.M. Taylor    
Palicourea sect. Montanae C.M. Taylor    
Palicourea sect. Obovoideae C.M. Taylor    
Palicourea sect. Pseudoamethystinae C.M. Taylor    
Palicourea sect. Psychotrioides C.M. Taylor    
Palicourea shuar C.M. Taylor
Palicourea simpsonii C.M. Taylor
Palicourea skotakii C.M. Taylor
Palicourea smithiana C.M. Taylor
Palicourea sopkinii C.M. Taylor
Palicourea spathacea C.M. Taylor
Palicourea stellata C.M. Taylor
Palicourea subalatoides C.M. Taylor
Palicourea subg. Montanae C.M. Taylor    
Palicourea subtomentosa subsp. lojana C.M. Taylor
Palicourea sucllii C.M. Taylor
Palicourea tilaranensis C.M. Taylor
Palicourea topoensis C.M. Taylor
Palicourea tunquiensis C.M. Taylor
Palicourea ucayalina C.M. Taylor
Palicourea ulloana C.M. Taylor
Palicourea valenzuelana C.M. Taylor
Palicourea vernicosa C.M. Taylor
Palicourea vulcanalis Standl. ex C.M. Taylor
Palicourea yanesha C.M. Taylor
Palicourea zarucchii C.M. Taylor
Patima minor C.M. Taylor
Pentagonia angustifolia C.M. Taylor
Pentagonia australis C.M. Taylor & Janovec  
Pentagonia dwyeriana C.M. Taylor
Pentagonia involucrata C.M. Taylor
Pentagonia lobata C.M. Taylor
Pentagonia monocaulis C.M. Taylor
Pentagonia osaensis C.M. Taylor
Pentagonia sanblasensis C.M. Taylor
Pittoniotis rotata C.M. Taylor
Posoqueria chocoana C.M. Taylor
Posoqueria correana C.M. Taylor
Posoqueria costaricensis C.M. Taylor
Posoqueria grandifructa Hammel & C.M. Taylor
Posoqueria laevis C.M. Taylor
Posoqueria longifilamentosa C.M. Taylor
Posoqueria robusta Hammel & C.M. Taylor
Posoqueria tarairensis C.M. Taylor & Cortés-Ballén  
Psychotria acicularis C.M. Taylor
Psychotria anisophylla C.M. Taylor
Psychotria areolata C.M. Taylor
Psychotria awa C.M. Taylor
Psychotria burgeri C.M. Taylor
Psychotria calidicola C.M. Taylor
Psychotria calyptrata C.M. Taylor
Psychotria cauligera C.M. Taylor
Psychotria cenepensis C.M. Taylor
Psychotria ceronii C.M. Taylor
Psychotria cerrocoloradensis Dwyer ex C.M. Taylor
Psychotria chamelaensis C.M. Taylor & Domínguez Licona, Eduardo
Psychotria chocoana C.M. Taylor
Psychotria cochabambana C.M. Taylor
Psychotria convergens C.M. Taylor
Psychotria cornejoi C.M. Taylor
Psychotria cutucuana C.M. Taylor
Psychotria davidsmithiana C.M. Taylor
Psychotria deneversii C.M. Taylor
Psychotria diminuta C.M. Taylor
Psychotria esmeraldana C.M. Taylor
Psychotria fusiformis C.M. Taylor
Psychotria gaitalensis C.M. Taylor
Psychotria grahamii C.M. Taylor
Psychotria hamiltoniana C.M. Taylor
Psychotria hemisphaerica Dwyer ex C.M. Taylor
Psychotria herrerana C.M. Taylor
Psychotria huampamiensis C.M. Taylor
Psychotria hypochlorina C.M. Taylor
Psychotria jefensis Dwyer ex C.M. Taylor
Psychotria juarezana C.M. Taylor & Lorence  
Psychotria leitana C.M. Taylor
Psychotria lorenciana C.M. Taylor
Psychotria matagalpensis C.M. Taylor
Psychotria maynasana C.M. Taylor
Psychotria monsalveae C.M. Taylor
Psychotria montivaga C.M. Taylor
Psychotria orosioides C.M. Taylor
Psychotria ortiziana C.M. Taylor
Psychotria osaensis C.M. Taylor
Psychotria ovatistipula C.M. Taylor
Psychotria ownbeyi Standl. ex C.M. Taylor
Psychotria paeonia C.M. Taylor
Psychotria pandoana C.M. Taylor
Psychotria paradichroa C.M. Taylor
Psychotria paravillosa C.M. Taylor
Psychotria purpureocapitata Dwyer ex C.M. Taylor
Psychotria puyoana C.M. Taylor
Psychotria rhombibractea C.M. Taylor & M.T. Campos 
Psychotria rhombibracteata C.M. Taylor & M.T. Campos 
Psychotria romolerouxiana C.M. Taylor
Psychotria sacciformis C.M. Taylor
Psychotria saltatrix C.M. Taylor
Psychotria sanblasensis C.M. Taylor
Psychotria sanchezii C.M. Taylor
Psychotria simiarum subsp. chiapensis C.M. Taylor
Psychotria sinuata C.M. Taylor
Psychotria soejartoi C.M. Taylor
Psychotria sopkinii C.M. Taylor
Psychotria tapantiensis C.M. Taylor
Psychotria ucumariana C.M. Taylor
Psychotria vesiculifera C.M. Taylor
Raritebe axillare C.M. Taylor
Remijia uniflora C.M. Taylor
Rosenbergiodendron reflexum C.M. Taylor & Lorence  
Rudgea grandifructa C.M. Taylor & M. Monsalve 
Rudgea hemisphaerica Dwyer ex C.M. Taylor
Rudgea laevis C.M. Taylor
Rudgea mandevillifolia Dwyer ex C.M. Taylor
Rudgea mcphersonii Dwyer ex C.M. Taylor
Rudgea sanblasensis C.M. Taylor
Rustia kosnipatana S. Will & C.M. Taylor 
Sabicea chocoana C.M. Taylor
Schizocalyx condoricus D.A. Neill & C.M. Taylor 
Schizocalyx truncatus C.M. Taylor
Schradera obtusifolia C.M. Taylor
Schradera reticulata C.M. Taylor ex J. Sánchez-Gonz.  
Simira cesariana C.M. Taylor
Simira hirsuta C.M. Taylor
Warszewiczia uxpanapensis subsp. meridionalis C.M. Taylor

Works
Selected publications on Palicourea taxonomy 
 Taylor, C.M. 1997. Conspectus of the genus Palicourea (Rubiaceae: Psychotrieae) with the description of same new species from Ecuador. Ann. Missouri Bot. Gard. 84: 224-262.
 Taylor, C.M, D.H. Lorence, & R.E. Gereau. 2010. Rubiacearum americanarum magna hama pars XXV: The nocturnally flowering Psychotria domingensis-Coussarea hondensis group plus three other Mesoamerican Psychotria species transfer to Palicourea. Novon 20: 481-492.

Selected Publications on Genera of Palicoureeae and Psychotrieae 
 Taylor, C.M. 2001. Overview of the neotropical genus Notopleura (Rubiaceae: Psychotrieae), with the description of some new species. Ann. Missouri Bot. Gard. 88: 478-515.
 Taylor, C.M. 2003. Rubiacearum americanarum magna hama. Pars XIV. New species and a new combination in Notopleura (Psychotrieae) from Central and South America. Novon 13: 228-260.
 Taylor, C.M. 2005. Margaritopsis (Rubiaceae, Psychotrieae) in the Neotropics. Syst. Geogr. Pl. 75: 161-177.
 Taylor, C.M. 2011. The genus Coccochondra (neotropical Rubiaceae) expanded. Pl. Ecol. & Evol. 144(1): 115-118.
 Taylor, C.M. & R.E. Gereau. 2013. The genus Carapichea (Rubiaceae). Ann. Missouri Bot. Gard. 99: 100-127.
 Razafimandimbison, S.G., C.M. Taylor, N. Widstrom, T. Paillier, A. Khobadandeh, B. Bremer. 2014. Phylogeny and generic limits in the sister tribes Psychotrieae and Palicoureeae (Rubiaceae): Evolution of schizocarps in Psychotria and origins of bacterial leaf nodules of the Malagasy species. Amer. J. Bot. 101: 1102-1126.
 Taylor, C.M. 2015. Rubiacearum americanarum magna hama XXXIII: Overview of the new group Palicourea sect. Didymocarpae with four new species and two new subspecies (Palicoureeae). Novon 23: 452-478.
 Taylor, C.M. 2015. Rubiacearum americanarum magna hama XXXIV: Overview of the new group Palicourea sect. Tricephalium with either new species and a new subspecies (Palicoureeae). Novon 24: 55-95.

Selected flora treatments 
 Taylor, C.M. 1999. Faramea, Coussarea, Palicourea. In: G. Harling and L. Andersson, eds. Flora of Ecuador 62(3): 134-235, 245-314.
 Taylor, C.M., J.A. Steyermark, P. Delprete, C. Persson, C. Costa, A. Vincentini, & R. Cortés. 2004. Rubiaceae. In: J.A. Steyermark, P.E. Berry, K. Yatskievych, & B.K. Holst, eds. Flora of the Venezuelan Guayana 8:497-847.
 Campos, M.T.V.A., C.M. & Taylor & D. Zappi. 2007. Rubiaceae. In: M. Hopkins et al., Flora of the Ducke Reserve. Rodriguesia 58: 549-616.
 Chen, T., H. Zhu; J.-R. Chen; C.M.Taylor, F. Ehrendorfer, H. Lantz, A.M. Funsten, C. Puff. 2011. Rubiaceae. In: Z.-G. Wu, P.H. Raven, & D.-Y. Hong, dirs. Flora of China 19: 57-368.
 D.H. Lorence, C.M. Taylor, & Collaborators. 2012. Rubiaceae. In: Flora Mesoamericana 4(2): 1-288.
 Taylor, C.M., B.E. Hammel, & D.H. Lorence. 2014. Rubiaceae. In: B.E. Hammel, M.H. Grayum, M.C. Herrera Mora, & N. Zamora, eds. Manual de Plantas de Costa Rica. Volumen VII. Dicotiledóneas (Picramniaceae-Rutaceae). Monogr. Syst. Bot. Missouri Bot. Gard. 129: 464-779.

Selected floristic catalogues 
 Taylor, C.M. & A. Pool. 1993. Rubiaceae. In: L. Brako et al., Catalogue of the Flowering Plants and Gymnosperms of Peru. Monogr. Syst. Bot. Missouri Bot. Gard. 45: 1010 1053. 
 Taylor, C.M. 1999. Rubiaceae. In P. Jørgensen & S. León, Catalogue of the vascular plants of Ecuador. Monogr. Syst. Bot. Missouri Bot. Gard.75: 855-878. 
 Bacigalupo, N.M., E.L. Cabral, & C.M. Taylor. 2008. Rubiaceae. In: F.O. Zuloaga, O. Morrone, & M.J. Belgrano, eds. Católogo de las Plantas Vasculares del Cono Sur. Monogr. Syst. Bot. Missouri Bot. Gard. 107(3): 1871-2920. 
 Taylor, C.M. 2011. Rubiaceae. In: A. Idárraga P., R. del C. Ortiz, R. Callejas P., & M. Merello. Flora de Antioquia, Catálogo de las Plantas Vasculares, Vol. 2, Listado de las Plantas Vasculares del Departamento de Antioquia, pp. 822–854. Universidad de Antioquia. 
 Taylor, C.M., E. Cabral, & N. Bacigalupo. 2014. Rubiaceae. In: P. Jørgensen, M. Nee, & S. Beck, eds. Catálogo de las Plantas Vasculares de Bolivia. Monogr. Syst. Bot. Missouri Bot. Gard. 127(2): 1140-1171.

References

External links
 

Living people
21st-century American botanists
Missouri Botanical Garden people
1955 births
University of Michigan alumni